Vijayavalli is a given name of these characters from the Hindu scriptures:
 Vindhyavalli, the spouse of Mahabali
 Vijayavalli, the spouse of Sudarshana or Chakrapani